Islamic Kasim Tuet Memorial College (IKTMC) is a secondary school in Chai Wan, Hong Kong. It is named after Kasim Tuet, a Hui Muslim who played a major role in the development of Chinese Muslim education in the city. Formerly known as the Islamic College, Islamic Kasim Tuet Memorial College is the only Islamic secondary school aided by the Hong Kong Education Bureau (EDB). Islamic Kasim Tuet Memorial College has a site area of 6,900 sq m. The 7-storey building is endowed with spacious playgrounds and open areas. There are 26 classrooms, over 20 special rooms (including library, counselling room, career and guidance room, etc.), a hall, 2 basketball courts, 1 cricket court, and 2 covered playgrounds. IKTMC's student composition includes students from Malaysia, India, Nepal, Bangladesh, Pakistan, Philippines, Iran, Indonesia, Saudi Arabia, China, and Yemen.

The school's current principal is Ms. Ho Sau Yin, Zareenah, and the vice-principals are Abu Bakar Ma Wing Cheung (Student Affairs) and Choi Kim Hung (Administrative & Academic Affairs) respectively. Over the past few years, the school has seen its graduates go on to prestigious universities in Hong Kong such as the University of Hong Kong, as well as reputable universities overseas in countries like the UK, Turkey, Indonesia, China, Bangladesh and Malaysia. The school's robotics team has won championship awards at InfoMatrix for the past two years (most recently in Romania), and its debating team won the championship title at the 2019 Hong Kong Schools Debating Competition (Division I), beating hundreds of other schools across the city.

History 

Founded in 1970 as Islamic College, the school was formally renamed Islamic Kasim Tuet Memorial College in 1997. It is founded and sponsored by the Chinese Muslim Cultural and Fraternal Association. The school motto is composed of four key Chinese characters: Prolific, Academic, Affectionate, and Cooperative, which represent the fraternal nature and peace-loving spirit of Islamic teachings.

Academics 
The school has 6 grades, namely Secondary 1 to Secondary 6 (S1-S6). The S1-S3 curriculum includes the 8 key learning areas as introduced by EDB, namely:

 Chinese Language Education
 English Language Education
 Mathematics Education
 Personal, Social, Humanities Education
 Science Education
 Technology Education
 Arts Education
 Physical Education.

The school implements the New Secondary School Curriculum at Secondary 4. Apart from the 4 core subjects (i.e. Chinese Language, English Language, Mathematics, and Liberal Studies), students may choose to study 3 or 2 more other subjects.

At present, students in S1-S6 are taught according to the HKDSE syllabuses and helped to prepare for the Hong Kong Diploma of Secondary Education.

Special arrangements are made and school-based curriculum is utilized for non-Chinese students, who will sit for the GCSE and GCE Chinese Language examination conducted in Hong Kong.

Student life

School bus service 
The school provides school bus service from all parts of Kowloon and New Territories (Tuen Mun, Yuen Long, Tin Shui Wai, Kam Tin, Tung Chung, Kwai Chung, Tsuen Wan, Lai King, Sha Tin, Tseung Kwan O, etc.) to the school and vice versa.

Oversea educational trips 
The school has organized trips to Umrah, Brunei, Turkey, Germany, Switzerland, USA, China (Beijing, Shanghai, Hainan etc.), Singapore, Malaysia and Japan over the past few years.

Notable staff and alumni

Wong Ka Chun (Max) 

He is awarded as one of the Ten Outstanding Young Persons Hong Kong 2017. He is a registered teacher, social worker, and auxiliary police inspector. He is the head of Discipline and Counseling Committee in IKTMC.

Cheng Ka Ho 
Ka Ho, MH graduated from Islamic College (later named as Islamic Kasim Tuet Memorial College) in 1990s. Previously the captain of Hong Kong Martial Arts Team, he is now the Senior Business Development Manager of the Hopewell Holdings Limited. He won three world championships in Nan Gun (Southern Staff) and Nan Quan (Southern boxing) in 1999, 2003 and 2005 competitions respectively.

Ifzal Zaffar 
He graduated in the school year of 2013–2014 at the Islamic Kasim Tuet Memorial College. He is now a member of the Yau Tsim district patrol unit. Ifzal Zaffar made headlines around the world in 2017 after he climbed up the crane on a construction site near the Western Harbour Tunnel and persuaded the distressed man to come down by reassuring him in Urdu.

Khan Uzma Nisa 

She graduated from IKTMC in 2017 and achieved 34 points in the HKDSE. Due to her outstanding academic performance as an ethnic minority, she has been featured by several Hong Kong media.

Bibi Tayyaba 
She graduated from IKTMC in 2012. she was awarded the Sir Edward Youde Memorial Scholarship. She has been admitted to the MSc in Education (Higher Education) programme of the University of Oxford starting from the 2017/18 academic year with the aid of a scholarship. Due to her outstanding academic performance as an ethnic minority, she has been featured by several media. She is now an English Language Lecturer at the Education University of Hong Kong.

Visits by prominent figures 
1. Mr. Patrick Nip JP, Secretary for Constitutional and Mainland Affairs Had an Unforgettable Visit to IKTMC: Mr. Patrick Nip Tak-kuen, JP, the secretary for Constitutional and Mainland Affairs, Mr. Chiu Chi-keung, BBS, Vice Chairman, Eastern District council, Miss Anne Teng, JP, Eastern District Officer and Mr. Kenneth Ng, Political Assistant to Secretary for Constitutional and Mainland Affairs visited IKTMC on 17 November 2017.
2. Professor Peter Mathieson: The previous president of the University of Hong Kong gave a talk on "Education in the 21st century: Roles of School Heads, Teachers, and Parents" on the first day of IKTMC Information Days on 1 December 2017. The talk shed light on the importance of diverse roles of parents, teachers, and school administrators in education.

See also 
 Islam in Hong Kong

References 

Secondary schools in Hong Kong
Islam in Hong Kong
Chai Wan